The meridian 41° west of Greenwich is a line of longitude that extends from the North Pole across the Arctic Ocean, Greenland, the Atlantic Ocean, South America, the Southern Ocean, and Antarctica to the South Pole.

The 41st meridian west forms a great circle with the 139th meridian east.

From Pole to Pole
Starting at the North Pole and heading south to the South Pole, the 41st meridian west passes through:

{| class="wikitable plainrowheaders"
! scope="col" width="120" | Co-ordinates
! scope="col" | Country, territory or sea
! scope="col" | Notes
|-
| style="background:#b0e0e6;" | 
! scope="row" style="background:#b0e0e6;" | Arctic Ocean
| style="background:#b0e0e6;" |
|-
| style="background:#b0e0e6;" | 
! scope="row" style="background:#b0e0e6;" | Lincoln Sea
| style="background:#b0e0e6;" |
|-
| style="background:#b0e0e6;" | 
! scope="row" style="background:#b0e0e6;" | De Long Fjord
| style="background:#b0e0e6;" |
|-
| 
! scope="row" | 
| Nansen Land
|-
| style="background:#b0e0e6;" | 
! scope="row" style="background:#b0e0e6;" | J.P. Koch Fjord
| style="background:#b0e0e6;" |
|-
| 
! scope="row" | 
| Freuchen Land
|-
| 
! scope="row" | 
| Odinland
|-
| style="background:#b0e0e6;" | 
! scope="row" style="background:#b0e0e6;" | Atlantic Ocean
| style="background:#b0e0e6;" |
|-valign="top"
| 
! scope="row" | 
| Ceará Piauí — from  Pernambuco — from  Bahia — from  Minas Gerais — from  Espírito Santo — from  Minas Gerais — for about 18 km from  Espírito Santo — from  Minas Gerais — from  Espírito Santo — from  Rio de Janeiro — from 
|-valign="top"
| style="background:#b0e0e6;" | 
! scope="row" style="background:#b0e0e6;" | Atlantic Ocean
| style="background:#b0e0e6;" | Passing close to the coast of Brazil, east of São João da Barra
|-
| 
! scope="row" | 
| Rio de Janeiro
|-
| style="background:#b0e0e6;" | 
! scope="row" style="background:#b0e0e6;" | Atlantic Ocean
| style="background:#b0e0e6;" |
|-
| style="background:#b0e0e6;" | 
! scope="row" style="background:#b0e0e6;" | Southern Ocean
| style="background:#b0e0e6;" |
|-valign="top"
| 
! scope="row" | Antarctica
|-
|}

See also
40th meridian west
42nd meridian west

w041 meridian west